Olha Yefimenko (born 17 May 1978) is a Ukrainian diver. She competed in the women's 3 metre springboard event at the 2000 Summer Olympics.

References

1978 births
Living people
Ukrainian female divers
Olympic divers of Ukraine
Divers at the 2000 Summer Olympics
Place of birth missing (living people)